Admiral Sir John Hereward Edelsten  (12 May 1891 – 10 February 1966) was a senior Royal Navy officer who went on to be Commander-in-Chief, Portsmouth.

Early life
Edelsten was born 12 May 1891 in Enfield, Middlesex, England the third son to John Jackson Edelsten and Jessica Gooding. John Jackson Edelsten owned a tea broker business.

Naval career
Edelsten joined the Royal Navy in 1908. He served in World War I and then became Deputy Director of Plans in 1938.

He also served in World War II initially as Senior Naval Officer during operations against Italian Somaliland before becoming Chief of Staff to the Commander-in-Chief, Mediterranean Station in 1941. He was made Assistant Chief of the Naval Staff (U-boat Warfare and Trade) in 1942 and Rear Admiral (Destroyers) for the British Pacific Fleet in 1945.

After the War he commanded 1st Battle Squadron  and then 4th Cruiser Squadron before becoming Vice Chief of the Naval Staff in 1947. He was made Commander-in-Chief, Mediterranean Fleet in 1950; this post was dual hatted from 1952 as NATO Commander Allied Forces Mediterranean. 

In this capacity he conducted a two-day visit to Israel. His last post was as Commander-in-Chief, Portsmouth and NATO Allied Naval Commander-in-Chief, Channel Command in 1952; he retired in 1954.

He was also First and Principal Naval Aide-de-Camp to the Queen from 1953 to 1954.

Edelsten was appointed a Knight Grand Cross of the Royal Victorian Order in the 1953 Coronation Honours.

Family 
On 14 December 1926, Edelsten married Frances Anne Hoile Masefield at the Holy Trinity Church in London. Frances was born 14 October 1900 in Broughty Ferry, Forfarshire, Scotland to Henry Valentine Masefield and Caroline Gordon.

References

|-

|-

|-

|-

|-

1891 births
1966 deaths
Knights Grand Cross of the Order of the Bath
Knights Grand Cross of the Royal Victorian Order
Commanders of the Order of the British Empire
Royal Navy officers of World War I
Royal Navy admirals of World War II
Lords of the Admiralty
Admiralty personnel of World War II
People from Enfield, London
Military personnel from Middlesex